Jeremiah Griffin Harrison (born February 21, 1949) is an American musician, songwriter, producer, and entrepreneur. He began his professional music career as a member of the cult band the Modern Lovers before becoming keyboardist and guitarist for the new wave band Talking Heads. In 2002, Harrison was inducted into the Rock and Roll Hall of Fame as a member of Talking Heads.

Following David Byrne's announcement that Talking Heads disbanded in 1991, Harrison has focused more on producing other bands, a role he started while still with Talking Heads, first producing the album Milwaukee with Elliot Murphy, and then later working with Violent Femmes for their third album The Blind Leading the Naked in 1986.

During the 1990s, he produced a number of hit albums for bands such as Live, The Verve Pipe, Big Head Todd and the Monsters, and Kenny Wayne Shepherd among others.  He has also released three albums of solo music (all while Talking Heads were still active) and has participated in a number of partial reunions of Talking Heads. In 1999, he helped found the online music community GarageBand.com.

Early life
Harrison was born in Milwaukee, Wisconsin. He was exposed to artistic fields from a young age, his mother studied art and taught at the Art Institute of Chicago and the Layton School of Art, his father was a musician and worked as an executive in an advertisement firm. Harrison graduated from Shorewood High School (Wisconsin). where he played in many bands, was in the debate club, the student council, the youth club, the math club, also played basketball and was a part of the track team. He later attended Harvard University where he graduated Magna Plus Cum Laude in Visual and Environmental Studies in 1972 with his bachelor thesis being about the fields of painting, sculpture and drawing.

Career

The Modern Lovers
In 1972, Harrison met Jonathan Richman, and they formed The Modern Lovers. Harrison was introduced to Richman by mutual friend and journalist Danny Fields and the pair bonded over their shared love of the Velvet Underground. He joined The Modern Lovers in early 1971, playing on their debut album in 1972 in California (not released until 1976 and produced by John Cale), and left in February 1974, when Richman wished to perform his songs more quietly. Devastated by the breakup of the band, Harrison returned to Harvard to get his Master's degree in architecture.

Talking Heads
Harrison joined Talking Heads in 1977, after the release of their debut single "Love → Building on Fire". He was offered a spot in the band in 1976, while he was still studying at Harvard. Tina Weymouth phoned Harrison to ask him to come and see Talking Heads play in Boston, not knowing he had already seen them and had been impressed by their material. After the performance, Harrison did not give a precise answer about whether he would join the group. In September 1976, Harrison told Weymouth he would come to New York City to jam with the band, but he did not have enough money to take a bus. So he instead helped his friend, former Harvard classmate and Modern Lovers bassist Ernie Brooks, move to New York, hitching a ride with Brooks in the process. 

Harrison designed the cover for the band's third album in 1979, Fear of Music, which received a Grammy nomination for Best Recording Package. Between tours, Harrison started producing records, working with a group called the Escalators in New York and also New Wave soul singer Nona Hendryx. In 1980, Remain In Light caused a dispute in the band due to the credits when Harrison was given additional writing credit for "The Overload" and "Houses in Motion" alongside Brian Eno and David Byrne. 

In 1984, Harrison heard a recording on the radio of President Ronald Reagan, apparently from an off-air hot mic soundcheck saying, "My fellow Americans, I'm pleased to tell you today that I've signed leg­islation that will outlaw Russia forever. We begin bombing in five minutes." Though many people had heard of the joke, most had never actually heard the recording itself. Believing it summed up the entire Reagan presidency, Harrison tracked down a copy of the tape through a college radio station and then worked with co-producer Daniel Lazerus and funk bassist Bootsy Collins to create a song. "If the song is a hit," Harrison quipped, "I'll be willing to share royalties with 'lyricist' Ronald Reagan." When the song, "Five Minutes (Bonzo Goes to Washington)", was completed, no major label could guarantee a release before the 1984 Presidential election, so Harrison chose micro-label Sleeping Bag Records to release it in October 1984.

Solo career
Harrison has released three solo albums. Many have assumed that the title of his debut, The Red and the Black in 1981, derived from Stendhal's novel of the same name. But in 2021, Harrison admitted that the name was inspired by the group of Situationists. Some members who had come to the United States to join the protests at Harvard against the Vietnam War ended up living in Harrison's room and would constantly talk about their philosophy and Wilhelm Reich, which fascinated Harrison. From this time, Harrison remembered a pamphlet that Guy Debord created named "The Red and The Black" and he "just really liked" the title. The main thoughts behind the album were the ideas of communism and anarchism.

In 1988, he created Casual Gods, recorded in Milwaukee in a bomb-shelter-turned studio by the brother of Harrison's best friend in elementary school. During the day Harrison took care of his mother and during the night he worked at the studio. The track "Man with a Gun" was featured in the 1988 film Two Moon Junction, and the instrumental version of the same song was used in the 1986 Jonathan Demme film Something Wild. The single "Rev It Up" reached a high-point of number seven on the US Mainstream Charts in April 1988; In an interview, Harrison recounts taping the music video with a room full of babies. 

Harrison's last solo work was Walk on Water in 1990.

Post-Talking Heads
After the 1991 breakup of Talking Heads, Harrison turned to producing and worked on albums by bands including Hockey, Violent Femmes, The BoDeans, The Von Bondies, General Public, Live, Crash Test Dummies, The Verve Pipe, Poi Dog Pondering, Rusted Root, Stroke 9, The Bogmen, Black 47, The Mayfield Four, Of A Revolution, No Doubt,  Turkuaz, Josh Joplin Group, The Black and White Years, Kenny Wayne Shepherd, Bamboo Shoots, the String Cheese Incident and The Gracious Few. He was also Chairman of the Board for Garageband.com, an internet music resource he co-founded in 1999. As of 2015, Harrison is the founder and chairman of the board at RedCrow, which is a web based direct investment platform that connects financial and human capital to healthcare start-ups as "a community who share knowledge, interest and passion for healthcare innovation."

In 2021 Jerry joined Turkuaz and Adrian Belew for a series of shows celebrating 40 years of the album Remain in Light.

Film work
Harrison, as a member of Talking Heads, is featured throughout the 1984 concert film Stop Making Sense, directed by Jonathan Demme. Also during the Talking Heads era, Harrison made cameo appearances as Billy Idol, Kid Creole and Prince look-alike lip-synchers in David Byrne's 1986 film True Stories. Harrison also had a small part in the 2006 film The Darwin Awards as "Guy in Bar No. 1" alongside John Doe of the band X.

Personal life
Harrison currently resides in Mill Valley, California. He has been married since the late 1980s and has three children.

Discography

Talking Heads

Solo albums

Singles

The Heads

Production

References

External links
Jerry Harrison Interview for the NAMM Oral History Program (2016)

1949 births
Living people
20th-century American guitarists
20th-century American keyboardists
American male guitarists
American new wave musicians
Record producers from Wisconsin
American rock guitarists
Guitarists from Wisconsin
Harvard University alumni
The Modern Lovers members
Musicians from Milwaukee
Sire Records artists
Talking Heads members
Shorewood High School (Wisconsin) alumni